John Roll McLean (September 17, 1848 – June 9, 1916) was the owner and publisher of The Washington Post and The Cincinnati Enquirer.  McLean was also a one-time partner in the ownership of the Cincinnati Red Stockings baseball team of the American Association and also the Cincinnati Outlaw Reds of the Union Association.

He was born in Cincinnati, to Washington McLean (the owner and publisher of The Cincinnati Enquirer) and his wife, Mary. 

In 1904, he and Senator Stephen Benton Elkins built the Great Falls and Old Dominion Railroad.  McLean, Virginia, which grew up around the railroad, is named for him. In 1905, he and his father purchased a controlling interest in The Washington Post.

McLean received the Democratic Party's nomination for the United States Senate in 1885 and for the Ohio governor's seat in 1899. He lost both elections.

He married Emily Beale and was the father of Edward Beale McLean, who took over ownership of the newspaper was the owner of the Hope Diamond. His sister, Mildred, was the wife of General William Babcock Hazen and Admiral George Dewey. His former estate, Friendship, is now McLean Gardens.

References

External links
 John R. McLean at Ohio History Central

1848 births
1916 deaths
Harvard University alumni
19th-century American newspaper publishers (people)
20th-century American newspaper publishers (people)
McLean family (United States)
The Cincinnati Enquirer people
Ohio Democrats